Biomax Informatics is a Munich-based software company.

Biomax can also refer to:
Biomax Procurement Services, a fake biomedical research company
Gasolineras Uno, known as Gasolineras Biomax in Colombia